The Institut d’histoire du temps présent, also known as IHTP is a French research unit within the CNRS. Since September 2019 IHTP has been located on the Condorcet campus of the Paris 8 University Vincennes-Saint-Denis at Aubervilliers.
IHTP focuses on the phenomenon of war in the 20th-century and on systems of political domination such as authoritarianism, totalitarianism and colonialism. It also examines the cultural history of contemporary societies and the epistemology of present day history in terms of its relationship to the past through the specific medium of memory, witness and the role of historians amidst population centres.

History 
It owes its foundation in 1978 to historian François Bédarida and was formally inaugurated in 1980. In 2016 it was constituted as a UMR and was attached to Paris 8 University Vincennes-Saint-Denis when it absorbed the former Comité d'histoire de la Seconde Guerre mondiale (CHSGM), dating back to 1951. Its membership consists of specialist researchers into World War II and those analysing particular themes of contemporary history. It is headed as of 2014 by the historian .

Research areas
Aside from conducting direct projects into recent and current history, it serves as a hub for several national and international research networks. Its laboratory holds a library comprising monographs, periodicals, oral and written archives, devoted to the Second world war, to decolonization and to spoken history. In 2019 the IHTP collections were integrated with the major documentary holdings of the Condorcet campus.

Staffing
IHTP teams are led by CNRS researchers who include Christian Ingrao, Malika Rahal, Henry Rousso, Peter Schöttler and Nicolas Werth.

Directors
 1978-1990 : François Bédarida
 1990-1994 : Robert Frank
 1994-2005 : Henry Rousso
 2006-2008 : Fabrice d'Almeida
 2008-2013 : Christian Ingrao
 Depuis 2014 : Christian Delage

See also 
 British Library Sound Archive
 Department of War Studies, King's College London
 Economic and Social Research Council
 Institut für Zeitgeschichte
 National Child Development Study
 NIOD Institute for War, Holocaust and Genocide Studies

References

External links 
IHTP Archives (held at the Grand Équipement documentaire of the Condorcet campus) : inventaire sur calames.abes.fr

Research institutes
Organizations established in 1978
History organizations based in France